Sofía Eastman Cox (27 January 1873 – 26 August 1944), also known as Sofía Eastman de Huneeus, was a Chilean feminist writer and socialite. In 1915, she was a founder and president of the Ladies' Reading Circle, one of the first women's groups in Chile, dedicated "to promote and cultivate letters and the arts from the point of view of reception and production, and to improve the quality of education received by women."

Eastman wrote mainly in newspapers and magazines in the early 20th century, and her poems appeared in several anthologies, including Amalia Errázuriz de Subercaseaux. For some authors, her work can be framed within so-called "aristocratic feminism", along with other writers such as Inés Echeverría Bello, María Mercedes Vial, Teresa Wilms Montt, Mariana Cox Méndez, and Luisa Lynch.

Works
 Memoria de la Cruz Roja de Mujeres de Chile (1922)

Anthologies
 Amalia Errázuriz de Subercaseaux (1946)

References

1873 births
1944 deaths
20th-century Chilean poets
20th-century women writers
Chilean people of English descent
Chilean women poets
Chilean socialites
People from Valparaíso
Chilean feminist writers